The Tri-County Conference is a high school athletic conference located in Mid-Missouri. The conference members are located in Boone, Cole, Cooper, Miller, Moniteau, and Morgan counties.

Member schools

Current members
The conference consists of mid-size schools (Class 4 in boys' basketball).

Notes

Former members

Membership timeline

State championships

Football
1990 - Warsaw
1993 - Warsaw
1997 - California
2004 - Blair Oaks
2006 - Blair Oaks
2018 - Blair Oaks
2020 - Blair Oaks
2022 - Blair Oaks

Boys' basketball
2001 - Blair Oaks

Boys' golf
1994 - Versailles
1997 - Tipton
2000 - Eldon
2001 - Eldon
2021 - California

Boys' wrestling
2014 - Blair Oaks

Baseball
2006 - Blair Oaks
2007 - Blair Oaks
2019 - Blair Oaks
2022 - Southern Boone

Boys' track & field
1973 - Camdenton

Volleyball
1991 - Eldon
2021 - Blair Oaks
2022 - Blair Oaks

Softball
2009 - Blair Oaks
2010 - Warsaw
2021 - Blair Oaks

Scholar Bowl
2014 - Hallsville
2015 - Hallsville
2018 - Hallsville

Boys' soccer
2020 - Southern Boone

Conference Champions

Football

References

Missouri high school athletic conferences
High school sports conferences and leagues in the United States